Maria Eugenia Vaz Ferreira (1875–1924) was an Uruguayan teacher and poet.  She was the younger sister of philosopher Carlos Vaz Ferreira and a contemporary of Delmira Agustini and Julio Herrera y Reissig. She was born and lived in Montevideo, the capital of Uruguay.

She held a Chair in Literature at the Women's University.  She suffered from mental illness and lost her reason some years before her death in 1924.

Her first volume of is entitled La isla de los canticos and consists of forty selected poems (and a single poem Unico poema added at her brother's insistence) which he published shortly after her death. A second volume, entitled La otra isla de los canticos, with a prologue by Emilio Oribe and containing a number of poems taken from her unpublished manuscripts, appeared in 1959 shortly after her brother's death.  The modern Poesías Completas contains 112 poems.

Vaz Ferreira is regarded as a metaphysical poet who wrote emotive poems that speak of passion, death, hope, and the mysteries of love and existence.

She was also a musician, and the Lauro Ayestarán collection contains one of her manuscript scores with verses and music.

Contrasting myths have been built around her life. She has been idealised as, on the one hand, a type of consumptive virgin but, on the other hand, a Sandesque cigar-smoking crossdresser notorious for practical jokes.

Posthumous works
 La isla de los canticos, 1925
 La otra isla de los canticos, Impresora Uruguaya, Montevideo, 1959
 Poesías Completas, Hugo J. Verani, Ediciones de la Plaza, 1986, 292 pp

Bibliography 
 Antología de Poetisas Americanas, Parra del Riego, Juan, Montevideo, 1923, Pages 7–25.
 100 autores del Uruguay, Paganini, Alberto, Paternain, Alejandro, Saad, Gabriel, Capítulo oriental, Montevideo.
 Parthenon West Review (Issue Four) eds Holler, David and Sweeney, Chad contains some translations by Liz Henry.

External links

 Biography (in Spanish)
 Holocausto and Unico poema (in Spanish)
  (in English)

1875 births
1924 deaths
People from Montevideo
Uruguayan people of Portuguese descent
20th-century Uruguayan poets
Uruguayan women poets
20th-century Uruguayan women writers